Chlamydastis batrachopis is a moth in the family Depressariidae. It was described by Edward Meyrick in 1913. It is found in Peru.

The wingspan is about 34 mm. The forewings are pale dull olive-ochreous mixed with whitish and with four dull olive-ochreous fasciae mixed with fuscous, appearing greenish-tinged, the first at one-fourth, slender, irregular, the second reduced to the costal, discal, and submedian spots, the third from three-fourths of the costa to before the tornus, very narrow between a costal blotch and the middle, the fourth terminal on the lower half and forming four pre-terminal spots on the upper half. The second discal stigma forms an oblique black transverse mark and there is a transverse tuft of scales in the disc near before this, and another on the fold before the middle. The hindwings are dark grey.

References

Moths described in 1913
Chlamydastis